Christian Marjory Emily Carlyle Waller (Yandell) (2 August 1894 - 25 May 1954) was an Australian printmaker, illustrator, muralist and stained-glass artist. At 15 she moved to Melbourne, where she studied at the National Gallery School. In 1915 she married fellow-student Mervyn Napier Waller.

Christian Waller was Australia's only professional woman stained-glass artist until the craft revival of the 1970s and was much sought-after as an illustrator and stained-glass artist; after the War, she had a five-year waiting list and more commissions than she could execute. Her glass adorns over 20 churches in Victoria and New South Wales.

Early life 
Waller was born in Castlemaine, Victoria, to Emily and William Yandell, a plasterer, who died when she was five, when she moved to Langston Street, Bendigo to live with her sister Florence and husband Alexander James Sclater. She was one of seven children.

Early career 

Christian studied painting at Castlemaine School of Mines under Carl Steiner and then at Bendigo School of Mines with Hugh Fegan. In 1909, her painting A Petition (a Greek scene featuring her sister Florence), was accepted for exhibition in the Bendigo Art Gallery, and was shown at the local Masonic Hall, the gallery committee noting that "Miss Christian Yandell, who is only 14 years of age, is considered by competent critics to be a rising artist." The mayor and the Masonic Lodge raised money through the sale of her works by art union to send her to study art in Melbourne, where she exhibited in the Singer's Depot windows in The Block, Collins Street in 1910.

That year, Christian moved to Melbourne where she studied at the National Gallery School under Frederick McCubbin and Bernard Hall. While there she won several student prizes and exhibited with the Victorian Artists Society (1913–22). She illustrated numerous publications, such as Melba's Gift Book of Australian Art and Literature (1915), many published by Edward Vidler. She met and married fellow-student Mervyn Napier Waller in 1916.

During the 1920s, Waller became a leading book illustrator, winning acclaim as the first Australian artist to illustrate Alice in Wonderland (1924). "Yandell’s drawings are an eclectic mix, ranging from depictions of the iconic Mad Hatter’s Tea Party through to densely drawn processional scenes and simple sketches of Wonderland’s inhabitants." Her skill in drawing was conspicuous and was praised by fellow students such as Ola Cohn. Her illustration work supported her husband Napier when he returned from the War wounded, and was unable to work for some time.

While at art school Waller became interested in Theosophy, which was very much dans le vent at the time, She did not become a member but joined the Library and attended lectures. This was an important influence on her for the rest of her life, although she never abandoned the Christian faith altogether, creating a personal synthesis of these beliefs.

Graphic works 

As a printmaker, Waller is best known for her powerful, bold linocuts printed on her own press, including many bookplates for friends. She exhibited extensively at the usual venues: the Victorian Artists Society, Robertson and Mullens and the New Gallery. Her work was appreciated by critics and sought after. Her early illustrations partake of a range of influences from the 'golden age of printmaking', including Aubrey Beardsley, Kai Nielsen and Arts and Crafts illustration. Her linocuts exhibited Art Deco tendencies stylistically, while having a range of symbolic references drawn from classical and Arthurian mythology, Egyptian and Hermetic lore and astrology and numerology. She created linocut bookplates for many of her friends.

Her tour de force was the set of seven printsThe Great Breath (1932). These illustrated Theosophical doctrine drawn from Madame Blavatsky's The Secret Doctrine, and were well received by critics such as Blamire Young and Harold Herbert.  They were produced by her own Golden Arrow Press, and Hendrik Kohlenberg suggests that Waller undertook most of the physical production of the book in her Fairy Hills studio. Only a small number of the planned 150 book edition for The Great Breath was ever produced.

She wrote a second book The Gates of Dawn, illustrated with lithographs, but put it aside to help Napier with his Newspaper House mosaic commission, and unfortunately never published it. It was published by her niece Klytie Pate with Richard Griffin in 1977. "Her print work is characterised by a complex symbolism, combining ancient classical and literary subjects alongside occult motifs in a dynamic style owing much to the bold geometry of Art Deco and the handmade ethos of the Arts and Crafts movement." A third book, The Woman of Faery, was projected but never completed.

In 1942 she painted a large mural of the Nativity for Christ Church, Geelong and in 1937 one of The Robe of Glory for Fawkner Crematorium; by 1948 she had completed more than fifty stained-glass windows.

Stained Glass 
Beside her graphic works, Waller was a leading professional stained-glass maker. She and Napier had begun to work for William Montgomery, a leading trade glass firm, while still students, and Christian began creating her own commissions from 1927. In 1929 she and Napier travelled to Europe where they spent valuable time at the Arts and Crafts studio of Veronica Whall in London and at An Túr Gloine in Ireland. On her return she devoted herself mainly to stained glass work, influenced by these studios. She was extensively patronised by the architect Louis Williams. From 1927 to 1953 she produced more than one hundred individual stained-glass panels. In this medium she was innovative, employing radical techniques unknown in Australia at the time.  She did all the work herself, while at the same time assisting Napier Waller with his increasing mosaic commissions.

Waller's windows display much of the Theosophical spirituality that she had first become interested in while at art school. Their symbolism is rich and complex, drawing on varied sources. Art historian Caroline Miley notes:"Her windows, mainly ecclesiastical commissions, are notable for the originality of their concepts, the beauty of their colouration and delicacy of painting. They combine subtle and varied symbolism with a strong personal element which gives them a drawing power beyond the usual."A catalogue raisonné of her stained glass (Caroline Miley Christian Waller Stained Glass: Towards the Light) was published in 2022. Large collections of her glass are at Geelong Grammar School Chapel; St James Anglican Church, Ivanhoe and St Mark's Anglican Church, Camberwell. Other notable works are at St Matthew's Anglican Church, Prahran; Scotch College Chapel; Christ Church Anglican Church, Geelong and Canterbury Uniting Church. Designs and drawings for stained glass are held in many Australian public gallery collections.

Personal life 
In 1915 Christian married a fellow artist, the muralist Napier Waller. They lived in a house and studios they designed in the Arts and Crafts manner at Crown Rd, Ivanhoe, Melbourne, in 1922. The couple were part of the social and artistic life of Melbourne and among their friends were their neighbour Norman McGeorge and the musicians Bernard Heinz and Fritz Hart, for whom Christian made posters and concert decorations.

Waller gathered around her a group of young people who she referred to as her 'children' and whom she mentored. The were her niece Klytie Pate (Sclater), Ron Meadows, Harry Tatlock Miller and Hilda Elliott. She took care of Klytie from about 1925, when Pate's father remarried and Klytie came to live with her aunt. Their relationship was close. Christian encouraged Pate's talents and she became a significant Australian potter, who shared the strong decorative approach of her aunt and mentor. In 2018 the Bendigo Art Gallery held an exhibition of both Waller's and Pate's work titled Daughters of the Sun.

In 1937 the marriage broke down and in 1939 Christian went to New York, where she joined the community of the African-American philosopher and mystic Father Divine. In 1940 she returned to the house at Ivanhoe. She immersed herself in her work and became increasingly reclusive.

Waller suffered from heart disease but continued to work, fulfilling an endless stream of commissions. She had to give up work in the early 1950s and died in 1954 aged only 59. She was cremated and her ashes interred at Fawkner Crematorium, where some years before she had painted The Robe of Glory.

Collections
 National Gallery of Australia: 83 works, and Napier Waller's portrait (1932) of his wife
 The Bendigo Art Gallery holds her self-portrait (1915)
 Castlemaine Art Museum holds 11 works
 National Gallery of Victoria: 50 works
 Art Gallery of New South Wales; 4 works
 Art Gallery of South Australia
 Hamilton Art Gallery
 Ballarat Art Gallery
 Warrnambool Art Gallery
 State Library of Victoria
 State Library of Queensland

Publications 
Though Waller completed The Gates of Dawn it was not published in her lifetime. Her niece Klytie  published it, as well as a facsimile edition of The Great Breath, with Gryphon Books in Melbourne in 1978.

Bibliography 

 Roger Butler Christian Waller 1895-1956 [sic] Deutscher Galleries, Armadale, 1978
 Emma Busowsky Cox (ed): Daughters of the Sun: Christian Waller and Klytie Pate Bendigo Art Gallery, Bendigo 2018
 Jenny McFarlane: Concerning the Spiritual: The Influence of the Theosophical Society on Australian Artists 1890-1934 Australian Scholarly Publishing, North Melbourne 2012
 Caroline Miley: Christian Waller Stained Glass: Towards the Light Australian Scholarly Publishing, North Melbourne 2022
 David Thomas (ed): The Art of Christian Waller Bendigo Art Gallery Bendigo 1992

Exhibitions 

 1923, 1 August: Exhibition of Woodcuts. Tyrrell's Galleries, NSW
 1931, 3–24 December: 7th Xmas Exhibition of Etchings and Woodcuts by Leading English and Australian Artists
 1932, 5–16 April: Exhibition of Linocuts, Everyman's Lending Library
 1932, 6–24 December: Eighth Xmas Exhibition of Etchings and Woodcuts by Master Etchers, Seddon Galleries, Melbourne
 1934, 16–26 November: Heidelberg Art Exhibition. Ivanhoe Hall

Posthumous 
 1976, 1 July 1976–1 October: Outlines of Australian Printmaking: Prints of Australia from the last third of the 18th century until the present time. Ballarat Fine Art Gallery
 1978, 13 April – 5 May: A Survey of Australian Relief Prints 1900 - 1950. Deutscher Galleries
 1978, 8–30 September 1978: Christian Waller 1895-1956 [sic]. Deutscher Galleries
 1983, 8 June–24 June: Images of Women Prints and Drawings of the Twentieth Century. University Of Melbourne Art Gallery
 1987, 30 April–30 May: Masterpieces of Australian printmaking. Josef Lebovic Gallery, Sydney
 1988, 5–26 March:  Australian women printmakers, Josef Lebovic Gallery, Sydney
 1992: The Art of Christian Waller, curated by David Thomas. Bendigo Art Gallery
 1992, 20 September – 25 October: The Art of Christian Waller. Castlemaine Art Gallery And Historical Museum
 1995, 8 March 1995: Women Printmakers 1910 to 1940 in the Castlemaine Art Gallery and Historical Museum. Castlemaine Art Gallery And Historical Museum
2017/18, 11 November—5 February: Daughters of the Sun: Christian Waller and Klytie Pate. Castlemaine Art Museum
2018/19, 10 November–10 February: Daughters of the Sun, curated by Emma Busowsky Cox, Bendigo Art Gallery

See also
 Theosophy and visual arts

References 

1894 births
1954 deaths
20th-century Australian women artists
20th-century Australian artists
Stained glass artists and manufacturers
Australian printmakers
People from Bendigo
People from Ivanhoe, Victoria
People educated at St Mary's College, Melbourne